Emory Lavelle "Buddy" Ensor (April 27, 1900 – November 13, 1947) was an American Thoroughbred horse racing Hall of Fame jockey.

Biography
A native of Maryland, Lavelle Ensor got his first professional riding job in 1918 with future Hall of Fame trainer H. Guy Bedwell. A naturally gifted talent, in 1918 he won a number of important races including the Coaching Club American Oaks, Saratoga Special Stakes and the Potomac Handicap when it was held at Laurel Park Racecourse. Within two years he had twice won five races on a single day and in 1920 he led all American jockeys with a 31% winning percentage. Ensor competed in the Kentucky Derby only twice, his best result a third in 1932 with Liz Whitney's colt, Stepenfetchit.

Lavelle Ensor's career was plagued by alcohol abuse and his misconduct eventually led to his suspension by The Jockey Club. In the early 1930s he returned to racing for a few years then came back to the track again in 1942. He retired permanently in 1945 with a career 21.1 winning percentage and in 1962 he was inducted posthumously in the National Museum of Racing and Hall of Fame.

Lavelle Ensor was married to Daisy Bennett (1902–1976) and they made their home in Saratoga Springs, New York. They are buried together in Saratoga Springs's Greenridge Cemetery.

References

External links
 Lavelle Ensor at the National Museum of Racing and Hall of Fame

 
 December 5, 1942 article in The New Yorker titled The Race Track by G. F. T. Ryall on Lavelle Ensor's alcoholism and riding comeback
 

1900 births
1947 deaths
American jockeys
United States Thoroughbred Racing Hall of Fame inductees
Sportspeople from Maryland
Alcohol abuse in the United States
Burials at Greenridge Cemetery